Jeh Jeh (also Romanized as Jahjah) is a village in Tombi Golgir Rural District, Golgir District, Masjed Soleyman County, Khuzestan Province, Iran. At the 2006 census, its population was 9, in 9 families.

References 

Populated places in Masjed Soleyman County